William Eugene Russell (December 2, 1932 – May 5, 1981), known as Gene Russell, was an American pop, jazz, and soul keyboardist who played acoustic and Fender Rhodes. He is mainly known for founding and releasing albums on Black Jazz Records.

Russell was born in Los Angeles, California and was a cousin of guitarist Charlie Christian. He studied with Hampton Hawes. In the 1960s and 1970s, he composed music for film and television also appearing as an actor. Russell played with Rahsaan Roland Kirk, Zoot Sims, Leroy Vinnegar, Dexter Gordon, Wardell Gray and Miles Davis.

With financing from Dick Schrory, Russell established Black Jazz Records in 1969. The aim of the record label was to promote young African American jazz musicians and singers.

He died in Los Angeles on May 5, 1981.

Discography
1967: Takin' Care of Business (Dot Records) - As the Gene Russell Trio
1967: Up and Away (Decca)
1971: New Direction (Black Jazz)
1972: Talk to My Lady (Black Jazz)
1981: Autumn Leaves (Sea Breeze)

References

African-American jazz musicians
American jazz organists
American male organists
American jazz pianists
American male pianists
American jazz composers
American male jazz composers
1932 births
1981 deaths
Black Jazz Records artists
Jazz musicians from California
20th-century American composers
20th-century American pianists
20th-century organists
20th-century American male musicians
20th-century jazz composers
African-American pianists
20th-century African-American musicians